Bruno Munari (October 24, 1907 in Milan – September 29, 1998 in Milan) was an Italian artist, designer, and inventor who contributed fundamentals to many fields of visual arts (painting, sculpture, film, industrial design, graphic design) in modernism, futurism, and concrete art, and in non-visual arts (literature, poetry) with his research on games, didactic method, movement, tactile learning, kinesthetic learning, and creativity. On the utility of art, Munari once said, "Art shall not be separated from life: things that are good to look at, and bad to be used, should not exist."

Early life
Bruno Munari was born in Milan but spent his childhood and teenage years in Badia Polesine, where his family had relocated to run a hotel. In 1926 he returned to Milan where he started to work with his uncle, who was an engineer. In 1927, he started to follow Marinetti and the Futurist movement, displaying his work in many exhibitions. Three years later he associated with Riccardo Castagnedi (Ricas), with whom he worked as a graphic designer until 1938. During a trip to Paris, in 1933, he met Louis Aragon and André Breton. From 1938 to September 1943 he worked as a press graphic designer for Mondadori, and as art director of Tempo Magazine and Grazia, two magazines owned by Mondadori. At the same time he began designing books for children, originally created for his son Alberto.

Futurism
Bruno Munari joined the 'Second' Italian Futurist movement in Italy led by Filippo Tommaso Marinetti in the late 1920s. During this period, Munari contributed collages to Italian magazines, some of them highly propagandist, and created sculptural works which would unfold in the coming decades including his useless machines, and his abstract-geometrical works. After World War II Munari disassociated himself with Italian Futurism because of its proto-Fascist connotations.

Later life
In 1948, Munari, Gillo Dorfles, Gianni Monnet and Atanasio Soldati, founded Movimento Arte Concreta (MAC), the Italian movement for concrete art. During the 1940s and 1950s, Munari produced many objects for the Italian design industry, including light fixtures, ash trays, televisions, espresso machines, and toys among other objects.

In his later life, Munari, worried by the incorrect perception of his artistic work, which is still confused with the other genres of his activity (didactics, design, graphics), selected art historian Miroslava Hajek as curator of a selection of his most important works in 1969. This collection, structured chronologically, shows his continuous creativity, thematic coherence and the evolution of his aesthetic philosophy throughout his artistic life.

Munari was also a significant contributor in the field of children's books and toys, later in his life, though he had been producing books for children since the 1930s. He used textured, tactile surfaces and cut-outs to create books that teach about touch, movement, and colour through kinesthetic learning.

Munari died in Milan on September 29, 1998.

Design and visual communication works

 Munari, Bruno; Scheiwiller, Giovanni (1963). Good design. Milan: All'insegna del pesce d'oro (later Scheiwiller Editore) 
 
  Munari, Bruno (1968). Design e comunicazione visiva. Contributo a una metodologia didattica [Design and Visual Communication. Contributions to a Teaching Method]. Roma-Bari: Laterza
 Munari, Bruno (1971). Artista e designer [Artist and Designer]. Roma-Bari: Laterza
 Munari, Bruno (1971). Codice ovvio [Obvious Code]. Turin: Einaudi 
 Supplemento al Dizionario Italiano. Mantova, Italy: Corraini. 2014
The following are included in Design as Art. They have also been published individually: 
 The Triangle. Mantova, Italy: Corraini. 2007.  
 The Discovery of the Circle. New York: G. Wittenborn. (English translation by Marcello and Edna Maestro.) 1965.  
 Discovery of the Square. New York: George Wittenborn. (English translation by Desmond O'Grady.) 1965.

Munari's books for children

The Elephant's Wish. The World Publishing Company. 1945. 
 Bruno Munari's Zoo. Cleveland: World Pub. Co. 1963.
 In the dark of the night. (Nella notte buia) New York: G. Wittenborn. 1961. 
 The circus in the mist. New York: World Pub. Co. 1969.
 The elephant's wish. Cleveland: World Pub. Co. 1959.
 "What I'd like to be". London (23 Lower Belgrave Street, London SW1): Printed and made in Italy and published by the Harvill Press. 1945. 
 Jimmy has lost his cap: where can it be? New York: W. Collins. 1980. 
 Who's there?: Open the door. New York: W. Collins. 1980. 
 Romilda the frog. Mantova: Maurizio Corraini. 1997.
 The lorry driver. London: Harvill Press. 1945.
 Bruno Books. Harvill Press: London; printed in Italy. 1953. Compilation of What I'd like to be; The Lorry driver; and Georgie has lost his cap.
 Animals for sale. Mantova: Maurizio Corraini. 2004. 
 From Afar it was an Island, Maurizio Corraini s.r.l. 2006
 Bruno Munari: From Afar It Is An Island, Emme Edizioni, Milan, 1971
 Drawing the sun
 Drawing a tree

Major exhibitions

 1954. Olivetti: Design in Industry. "Munari's Slides," used as an example of his pitture proiettate (1952–54; co-curated by Bruno Munari.)
 1986 A Bruno Munari Retrospective. Palazzo Reale, Milan, Italy
 1989 A Bruno Munari Retrospective. Museum of Jerusalem, Israel
 1995 Museum für Gestaltung, Zurich, Switzerland
 1995 Retrospective, Museo di Cantù, Italy
 1997 Bruno Munari Instalace, Museum of Modern Art, Klatovy Gallery, Klenova (Czech Republic)
 2004 Tinguely e Munari. Opere in azione, Museo La Spezia, Italy
 2007 Bruno Munari, Rotonda della Besana, Milan, Italy
 2008 Bruno Munari, The Museum of the Ara Pacis, Rome, Italy
 2012 Bruno Munari: My Futurist Past. Estorick Collection of Modern Italian Art, London, UK.

Awards and recognitions

Compasso d'Oro award from the ADI (Associazione per il Disegno Industriale) (1954, 1955, 1979)
Golden medal of the Triennale di Milano for the "Libri illeggibili" book (1957)
Andersen award as best child author (1974)
Honorable mention from the New York Science Academy (1974)
Graphic award in the Bologna Fair for the childhood (1984)
Award from the Japan Design Foundation, for the intense human value of his design (1985)
Lego award for his exceptional contributions to the development of creativity for children (1986)
Award from Accademia dei Lincei for his graphic work (1988)
Award Spiel Gut of Ulm (1971, 1973, 1987)
Honoris causa in architettura from the Genova University (1989)
ADCI Milan Hall of Fame in Creativity and Communication (1990)
 Marconi award of the Brera Academy (1992)
Cavaliere di Gran Croce (1994)
 Honorable partnership of Harvard University

Major collections and holdings

 Collezione Miroslava Hajek, Novara, Italy 
 Collezione Fondazione Danese-Vodoz, Milan, Italy 
 Collezione Angelo & Silvia Calmarini, Milan, Italy 
 Collezione Massimo & Sonia Cirulli Archive, New York 
 Collezione Dabbeni, Lugano, Switzerland 
 Collezione Bruno Munari. Museo Galleria del Design e dell’Arredamento, Milan, Italy.
 Fondazione Casaperlarte, Cantù, Italy 
 Fondo Munari CSAC, University of Parma, Italy 
 Museum of Modern Art, New York

See also
Industrial Design
List of notable industrial designers
Futurism

References

Further reading
 Bruno Munari: The Lightness of Art, ed. by Pierpaolo Antonello, Matilde Nardelli, Margherita Zanoletti (Oxford: Peter Lang, 2017).
In the Darkness of the Night: A Bruno Munari Artist's Book, Princeton Architectural Press, 2017.
 Bruno Munari: Square, Circle, Triangle, Princeton Architectural Press, 2016.
Miroslava Hajek, Luca Zaffarano, Bruno Munari: my futurist past, Silvana Editorale, 2012, .
Miroslava Hajek, Luca Panaro, Fantasia esatta i colori della luce di Bruno Munari, APM edizioni, 2008, .
Francesco Franco, Gianni Rodari e Bruno Munari. I cinque libri: racconti e disegni brevi, in "Bollettino '900", 2007, n. 1-2, .
Francesco Franco, Bruno Munari. Dalla copertina alla coperta, fino al riciclaggio del ciclo, in "BTA - Bollettino Telematico dell’Arte", 21/3/2007, n. 451, .
Miriam Nocchi Croccolo, Un progetto a lungo termine. I laboratori di Bruno Munari, Edizioni ETS, Pisa 2005.
Bruno Corà, Pietro Bellasi, Alberto Fiz, Miroslava Hajek, Guido Magnaguagno, Tinguely e Munari. Opere in azione, Mazzotta Editore, Milano 2004, .
Giorgio Maffei, Munari: i libri, Sylvestre Bonnard, 2002.
Claude Lichtenstein, Alfredo Haberli - Air Made Visible: A Visual Reader on Bruno Munari, Lars Muller, 2000.
Beppe Finessi, Su Munari - Abitare Segesta, 1999.
Alberto Fiz, Omaggio a Bruno Munari, Mazzotta editore, Milano 1999.
Miroslava Hajek, Bruno Munari, Revue Svetovej Literatury, 1997 n°1, page 145.
Miroslava Hajek, Bruno Munari, Instalace edizioni GKK 1997, .
Mostra di Bruno Munari, inventore artista scrittore designer architetto grafico gioca con i bambini, Corraini Editore, Milano 1995.
Marco Meneguzzo, Bruno Munari Mostra Collettiva, Adulti e bambini in zone inesplorate, Corraini Editore, Milano 1994.
Marco Meneguzzo, Bruno Munari, Laterza, 1993.
Marco Meneguzzo, Munari '50, La bellezza come funzione, Corraini Editore, 1991.
Bruno Munari, Editore Electa, 1986.
Aldo Tanchis, Bruno Munari, Idea Books, 1986.
Luciano Marucci, Viaggi nell'arte. Bruno Munari. Creativa mente, Cauda Pavonis, 1986.*

External links
MunArt (compendium of Munari's work, exhibitions, and biographical detail)
Bruno Munari holdings in the collection of the Museum of Modern Art (MoMA), New York
Bruno Munari books ( catalogue)
 Bruno Munari's books for Corraini Edizioni
 Bruno Munari speaking about didactic method, short documentary film (in italian)
 Bruno Munari entry, Treccani encyclopaedia (in italian)

1907 births
1998 deaths
Artists from Milan
Italian designers
Italian contemporary artists
Italian industrial designers
Burials at the Cimitero Monumentale di Milano
Olivetti people
Compasso d'Oro Award recipients